Wang Yuchen may refer to:

 Wang Yuchen (figure skater) (王瑀晨; born 2005), Chinese pair skater
 Wang Yuchen (snooker player) (王雨晨; born 1997), Chinese snooker player